Llaqta Qulluy (Quechua llaqta place (village, town, city, country, nation), qulluy to die out, become extinct; to fail, "extinct town", also spelled Llaqta Qolloy) is an archaeological site in Peru on a mountain of that name. It is situated in the Huancavelica Region, Huancavelica Province, Conayca District.

References 

Archaeological sites in Peru
Archaeological sites in Huancavelica Region
Mountains of Peru
Mountains of Huancavelica Region